The 1993 Wichita State Shockers baseball team represented Wichita State University in the 1993 NCAA Division I baseball season. The Shockers played their home games at Eck Stadium in Wichita, Kansas. The team was coached by Gene Stephenson in his sixteenth season as head coach at Wichita State.

The Shockers reached the College World Series, finishing as the runner up to LSU. This was their third consecutive appearance in Omaha, and third time advancing to the final in five years.

Personnel

Roster

Coaches

Schedule

References 

Wichita State
Wichita State Shockers baseball seasons
College World Series seasons
Wichita State Baseball
Missouri Valley Conference baseball champion seasons
Wichita State